Intimate Portrait is a biographical documentary television series on the Lifetime cable network hosted by Meredith Vieira and focusing on different female celebrities, including stars from the fields of cinema, music, politics, sports and others which includes interviews with each subject and appearance's by numerous stars discussing the subject. 12 seasons were made with a total of 271 episodes, airing from January 3, 1994, and October 3, 2005. The series utilises stock footage, on-camera interviews, and photographs of the celebrities as children.

List of Stars

Season 1 
(Notes: The series screened internationally, and dates are typical of original US broadcast sheet)

Season 2

Season 3

References

External links

Lifetime (TV network) original programming
1994 American television series debuts
2005 American television series endings
American non-fiction television series